Sergio Alejandro Díaz (born 9 February 1985) is a Spanish retired footballer who played as a central defender.

Club career
Díaz was born in Turón, Asturias. After starting out at local Real Oviedo, making his senior debut aged 17 in the Segunda División in a relegation-ending season, he finished his football development at Real Madrid, having joined in 2003.

Over two seasons in the second division – of the five in total he spent with the team– Díaz made a further seven league appearances with the reserves. He was also called up to the first team for a UEFA Champions League match against FC Dynamo Kyiv in December 2006 (the group stage's last), but remained an unused substitute; he earned another call that month, in La Liga against Sevilla FC, although he ultimately was cut from the final squad of 18.

For the 2008–09 campaign, Díaz signed with Hércules CF, who was coached by his former Castilla manager Juan Carlos Mandiá. He appeared very rarely for the fourth-placed team in division two, following a severe injury contracted in preseason.

Díaz moved to Gimnàstic de Tarragona in 2010–11, agreeing to a three-year deal with the second tier side. On 29 July 2011, however, he terminated his contract with the Catalans, and returned to old club Hércules the same day.

Honours
Spain U17
Meridian Cup: 2003

References

External links

1985 births
Living people
Spanish footballers
Footballers from Mieres, Asturias
Association football defenders
Segunda División players
Segunda División B players
Real Oviedo Vetusta players
Real Oviedo players
Real Madrid Castilla footballers
Real Madrid CF players
Hércules CF players
Gimnàstic de Tarragona footballers
Real Avilés CF footballers
Spain youth international footballers